Following is a list of senators of Ille-et-Vilaine, people who have represented the department of Ille-et-Vilaine in the Senate of France.

Third Republic

Senators for Ille-et-Vilaine under the French Third Republic were:

 Robert Bellanger (1933–1941)
 Eugène Brager de La Ville-Moysan (1904–1933)
 Alphonse de Callac (1888–1893)
 Paul Garnier (1920–1933)
 Georges Garreau (1897–1906)
 Alphonse Gasnier-Duparc (1932–1941)
 Louis Grivart (1876–1901)
 Henri Guérin (1897–1904)
 Léon Jenouvrier (1907–1932)
 Pierre Jouin (1879–1885)
 Henri de Kergariou (1876–1878)
 Ferdinand Baston de La Riboisière (1906–1919)
 Edgar Le Bastard (1879–1888)
 Alexandre Lefas (1933–1941)
 René Le Hérissé (1913–1920)
 Jean Lemaistre (1933–1941)
 Louis Lemarié (1907–1932)
 Charles Loysel (1876–1879)
 Eugène Pinault (1901–1913)
 André Porteu de la Morandière (1920–1932)
 Théophile Roger-Marvaise (1879–1888)
 Adolphe de Saint-Germain (1901–1907)
 Charles Stourm (1932–1940)
 Auguste Véron (1885–1897)
 Pierre-Marie Frain de La Villegontier (1888–1897)

Fourth Republic

Senators for Ille-et-Vilaine under the French Fourth Republic were:

Fifth Republic 
Senators for Ille-et-Vilaine under the French Fifth Republic:

References

Sources

 
Lists of members of the Senate (France) by department